HybriCell is a therapeutic vaccine developed by Brazilian immunologist Jose Alexandre Barbuto. The treatment, which inhibits the division of cancer cells, is aimed at patients in later stages of kidney cancer or melanoma. The vaccine works by extracting certain leukocytes from the patient's blood and merging them with cancer cells, enabling the body to recognize and attack other similar cancer cells. In studies conducted in 2001 and 2003, 80% of test subjects showed improvement without harmful side effects. Though test groups were relatively small, the results of the studies show evidence that the drug is effective.

Procedure
To create the vaccine, blood is drawn from the patient and monocytes specific to the patient are separated from the blood via apheresis. Dendritic cells are then derived by adding cytokines to the extracted monocytes. The dendritic cells are then fused with tumor cells through electrofusion, creating a "hybrid cell" of tumor and dendritic cells. These hybrid cells are then injected back into the patient. The hybrid cells are recognized by the body's immune system and these cells and cells like it are marked for destruction. The tumor cells, which were previously unrecognized by the body's immune system are subsequently attacked. The entire procedure takes up to 30 days to complete.

Each vaccine is specific to that patient. Though not a preventative measure, the vaccine's creator, Dr. Barbuto, predicted that the vaccine would be even more effective in patients in earlier stages of cancer. The vaccine is administered in conjunction with other cancer-preventative measures such as chemotherapy.

Clinical trials
, two studies have been conducted on this drug and its effects on renal cancer and melanoma. From March 2001 until March 2003, a study involving 35 people was done involving 13 melanoma and 22 renal carcinoma patients. In 2004, another study was done involving another 35 people. Over time, more patients were added to the study and it the test group eventually grew to beyond 100 participants. Overall, it was found that 80% of patients in these studies showed improvement without any side effects. Many of these patient's life expectancies were extended by as much as four times their original life expectancy.

References

Further reading 
 

Cancer vaccines